Body and Soul is a 1927 silent film starring Aileen Pringle, Norman Kerry, and Lionel Barrymore.  The film was directed by Reginald Barker.

The film has been preserved by MGM and George Eastman House.

Cast
Aileen Pringle as Hilda
Norman Kerry as Ruffo
Lionel Barrymore as Dr. Leyden
T. Roy Barnes as the Postman

See also
Lionel Barrymore filmography

References

External links

1927 films
1927 drama films
American silent feature films
Metro-Goldwyn-Mayer films
Silent American drama films
American black-and-white films
Films based on works by Katharine Newlin Burt
Films directed by Reginald Barker
1920s American films